Reddin Andrews (January 28, 1848 – August 16, 1923) was the president of Baylor University from 1885 to 1886.

Biography
Reddin Andrews was born in La Grange, Texas, on January 18, 1848. He fought in the Confederacy as a scout and a courier during the American Civil War. In 1871, he graduated from Baylor University as a valedictorian. From 1871 to 1873, he attended the Greenville Seminary in Greenville, South Carolina. He became a pastor in Navasota, Texas, and preached in Millican, Hempstead, Calvert, Tyler, Lampasas, Bastrop, Goodman, Webberville, Hillsboro, Woodbury, Rockwall and Lovelady.  He married Elizabeth Eddins in 1874 and they had nine children.  From 1871 to 1878, he was a professor at Baylor University. In 1878, he became the principal of the Masonic Institute in Round Rock.  He was an editor to John B. Link's Texas Baptist Herald. He served as president of Baylor University from 1885 to 1886, as it was merged with Waco University. In 1886, he helped merge the Baptist State Convention and Baptist General Association into the Baptist General Convention of Texas. In 1889, he moved to Atlanta, Georgia, to edit W.T. Martin's Gospel Standard and Expositor. In 1892, he moved to Belton, Texas, and worked for the People's Party. In 1907, he was the editor of Sword and Shield in Tyler. In 1910, he ran for governor as a socialist and lost to the Democratic nominee. In 1916, he moved to Lawton, Oklahoma, where he died in 1923.

Bibliography
Poems (1911)

References

1848 births
1923 deaths
American socialists
Baptists from Texas
Baylor University alumni
Baylor University faculty
Presidents of Baylor University
People from Lawton, Oklahoma
People from La Grange, Texas
People from Navasota, Texas
People from Belton, Texas
Texas socialists
Baptists from Oklahoma
19th-century Baptists